FC Nouadhibou is a Mauritanian professional football club based in the commercial centre of Nouadhibou, that competes in the Ligue 1 Mauritania, the top flight of Mauritanian football.

History
The club was founded in 1999 by a group young people led by Ahmed Yahya Ould Abderrahmane who became the club's first president. He is the current president of the FMF (Federation mauritanienne de Football).

Before the creation of the club, there was another club that existed in the late 20th century under the name Imraguens de Nouadhibou. It is unrelated to ASC Imraguens which is based in Atar in another region, an existing club.  The club participated for a few times at the WAFU Club Championship especially in 1987.

Nouadhibou's appearances at the national cup competitions was in 2004 and defeated 1–0 over ASC Ksar to win their first cup title, their recent appearance was in 2008 and defeated 1–0 over Nasr de Sebkha and won their recent cup title for the club.

Their first appearance at a continental competition was in 2003 and was in the preliminary round, the club faced Niger's AS Niamey and the score was 2–2 in two of its matches and lost under the away goals rule in Niamey.  Their second and recent appearance was in 2014 and faced Guinea's Horoya AC, the first match was tied apiece with one goal each, Nouadhibou lost the second match 0–3 and was out of the competition.  Nouadhibou did not participate in the 2002 and 2012 championships.

Nouadhibou equalled the Mauritanian record for titles with seven after winning the 2018–19 championship. They won the league title that season with two remaining games after defeating their local rival ASAC Concorde.

The club qualified for the group stage of the 2019-20 CAF Confederation Cup after defeating Triangle FC of Zimbabwe 4-3 on aggregate in the play-off round.

Titles
Ligue 1 (Mauritania)

Champion: (10): 2001, 2002, 2011, 2013, 2014, 2017–18, 2018–19, 2019–20, 2020–21, 2021–22

Coupe du Président de la République

Winner (4): 2004, 2008, 2017, 2018

Coupe de la Ligue Nationale

Winner (2): 2014, 2019

Mauritanian Super Cup

Winner (3): 2011, 2013, 2018

League and cup history

Performance in CAF competitions

National level

Statistics
Best position: Preliminary or Qualification Round (continental)
Appearances at a Super Cup competition: 3 (national)
Total goals scored at the CAF Champions League: 3
Total goals scored at the Super Cup: 4 (national)

Personnel

Management
{| class="wikitable"
|-
!Office
!Name
|-
|President
|Moulaye Boughourbal Abdel Aziz
|-
|Vice president of social area
|Salah Din Ould Bechir
|-
|Vice president of sports area
|Zakaria Abobekrin
|-
|Corporate director general
|Soueilima Ould Sidatty
|-
|Board secretary
|Soueilima Ould Sidatty
|-
|Treasurer
|Moulaye Ould Ahmed
|-
|Treasurer Assistant
|Baba Khalidou Haydara
|-

Presidents
Ahmed Yahya – first president
Moulaye Abdel Aziz Boughourbal (as of 2014)

References

External links
Official Website
FC Nouadhibou at National-Football-Teams.com
FC Nouadhibou at Soccerway.com

 
Football clubs in Mauritania
1999 establishments in Mauritania
Association football clubs established in 1999
Football
Nouadhibou